The lined gecko (Gekko vittatus), also known as the skunk gecko due to his notable stripe down its back, is a species of gecko.

It can be found in Indonesia, New Guinea, Palau, and the Solomon Islands.

White lined geckos usually live between 3-5 years in the wild; however, in captivity with proper care their lifespans drastically increase, including those wild caught. In captivity, they can live twice their wild lifespan at the minimum, with some individuals living 15-20 years with proper care.

References
 Bauer, A. M., et al. 1995. The Herpetological Contributions of Wilhelm C. H. Peters (1815-1883). SSAR Facsimile Reprints in Herpetology. 714 pp.
 King, M. 1977. Chromosomal and morphometric variation in the gekko Diplodactylus vittatus (Gray). Austral. J. Zool. 25: 43-57.
 Treu, B. 2001. Haltung und zucht des Streifengeckos, Gekko vittatus Houttuyn 1782. Sauria 23(4) 31-35.

External links
 

vittatus
Reptiles described in 1782
Taxa named by Martinus Houttuyn